L.A. Style was a Dutch electronic dance music group, consisting of founder, producer and radio DJ Wessel van Diepen (who later also created Nakatomi and the successful Vengaboys),  composer Denzil Slemming (a.k.a. Michiel Van Der Kuy of Laserdance fame) and FX aka Frans Merkx, as well as Foco (Alfons "Fonny" de Wulf) and Ray Decadance (surname Muylle) of the Belgian project Rofo (credited i.e. as writers and producers of "Balloony"). L.A. Style was most notable for their 1991 single "James Brown Is Dead", which appeared on Billboard's Hot 100 Airplay chart, becoming the first EDM group to venture near the top 50 of the main Billboard singles chart.

Another famous song of L.A. Style was Balloony of 1992.

Career
The group was fronted by rapper/singer/songwriter & producer FX AKA Eazee F & The BFD (real name Frans Merkx). Wessel van Diepen was known for his skill in bringing a different sound to dance and mixing that with the talents of the lead artist FX. FX is considered as one of the first to set the trend of combining Euro pop with Rap in an effort to bring the masses the flavor of Rap music with a different twist. FX had numerous hits with Infobeat, most notable the single 'We got the Funk' and 'Are u Ready'. At the time L.A. Style followed up the huge success of International hit "James Brown Is Dead" with the smash hit 'I'm Raving'. L.A. Style appeared on 'MTV 'The Grind' and toured extensively all over North America, Asia & Europe with massive success. FX [also known as The Godfather of Techno] and Wessel van Diepen helped pushed the boundaries of dance music to another level where it was acceptable to mix Rap, Rock & Techno and for all genres and people from walks of life to come together. It was a bold statement but because of their groundbreaking styles L.A. Style set the trend for other super groups like 2 Unlimited and 2 brothers on the 4th floor to name but a few.

They released a self-titled album as well as other singles, but despite massive success overseas as well as dance club play, L.A. Style's moment faded after the departure of the lead artist FX Frans Merkx and they quickly faded and dispersed in 1995. In recent years the group has again come to the attention of the pop world and rumors are that the group could be reformed with the original line up of FX as lead artist. There were also rumors that L.A. Style would be fronted by a totally new line up, however all agreed this would not go down well with the fans. Since the time of L.A. Style Wessel van Diepen continues to be one of the most sought after radio DJ's in The Netherlands and FX has been working with the main producer and old friend behind DJ Chukie, Mr. Fabian Lennsen. As FX has said, "I've worked with many great artists and even found  great artists and if something comes a long that excites me then I will be back in the studio."

Discography

Albums
L.A. Style (1993)

Singles

References

Dutch dance music groups
Dutch techno music groups
Hardcore techno music groups
Musical groups established in 1991
Musical groups disestablished in 1995
1991 establishments in the Netherlands